The 2004 AFC Asian Cup was the 13th edition of the men's AFC Asian Cup, a quadrennial international football tournament organised by the Asian Football Confederation (AFC). It was held from 17 July to 7 August 2004 in China. The defending champions Japan defeated China in the final in Beijing.

The tournament was marked by Saudi Arabia's unexpected failure to even make it out of the first round; a surprisingly good performance by Bahrain, which finished in fourth place; Jordan, which reached the quarterfinals in its first appearance and Indonesia, which gained their historical first Asian Cup win against Qatar. The final match between China and Japan was marked by post-match rioting by Chinese fans near the north gate of Beijing Workers' Stadium, in part due to controversial officiating and anti-Japanese sentiment resulting from historical tensions.

Venues

Qualification

The lowest-ranked 20 teams were placed in 6 preliminary qualifying groups of 3 and one group of 2, with the group winners joining the remaining 21 teams in 7 groups of 4. The top two of each of these groups qualified for the finals in China.

Notes:
1 Bold indicates champion for that year
2 Italic indicates host

Seeds

Squads

Tournament summary
This competition saw a huge number of surprises. The first surprise named Bahrain was in group A, which, despite being just its second tournament, held on China and fellow neighbor Qatar before beating Indonesia 3–1, with the Hubail brothers Mohamed and Ala'a instrumental in bringing Bahrain to the quarter-finals. Host China, after a shock draw to Bahrain, easily progressed to the next round after thrashing Indonesia 5–0 before Xu Yunlong scored the decisive goal in China's hard fought win over Qatar to process.

In group B, Jordan emerged as a second surprise, as the country just made its debut in the competition. Jordan surprised the whole tournament by two draws to the United Arab Emirates and, especially, a successful goalless draw to South Korea which had already finished in fourth place at the 2002 FIFA World Cup earlier, between that, Jordan shocked Kuwait with two late goals to seal a 2–0 victory, thus finishing second and progressed to the next round alongside South Korea, which, after being held by Jordan, decisively beat Kuwait and the United Arab Emirates to progress.

The two other debutants were Turkmenistan and Oman in group C and D surprised by not finishing bottom in their group, though they failed to progress. Instead, it was the two experienced Saudi Arabia and Thailand which disappointed most of fans, finishing bottom after disastrous performances. In group C, Uzbekistan also surprised by topping the group with three straight 1–0 win while Japan and Iran were able to progress in group D after a final goalless draw and better result than Oman. Iraq was the other qualifier in group C, after beating both Turkmenistan and Saudi Arabia only by one goal margin.

The quarter-finals saw Jordan caused significant problem for Japan, and Jordan was thought to have almost qualified for the semi-finals in the penalty shootout. However, four straight misses later cost Jordan's semi-final dream to end. Uzbekistan and Bahrain held on in a 2–2 draw and Bahrain prevailed after penalty shootout. Host China easily crushed Iraq 3–0, with Zheng Zhi scored two penalties to take Iraq home, while South Korea and Iran created the most phenomenon match in the tournament, an insane thriller where Iran prevailed 4–3 in what would be perceived as the greatest Asian Cup match in the history.

The first semi-final saw Iran and host China battling for the final, with both being held 1–1, despite Iran was down to ten men. China eventually won in penalty shootout. The other semi-final was another insane thriller between Bahrain and Japan, with the Japanese won after extra times thanked for a goal by Keiji Tamada in early minutes of the first half of extra times, thus sent Japan to the final against host China. Iran overcame Bahrain in a consolidating third place encounter, 4–2, to acquire bronze.

The final in Beijing saw China lose to Japan, with a controversial handball goal by Koji Nakata that sealed the game. The win meant Japan had successfully defended their title they achieved four years ago. The outcome frustrated many Chinese supporters, who ended up rioting outside Workers' Stadium over referee's controversial decision allowing the handball goal of Koji Nakata.

Officials
Referees

  Mark Shield
  Abdul Rahman Al-Delawar
  Coffi Codjia
  Lu Jun
  Masoud Moradi
  Toru Kamikawa
  Kwon Jong-chul
  Saad Kamil Al-Fadhli
  Talaat Najm
  Subkhiddin Mohd Salleh
  Naser Al-Hamdan
  Shamsul Maidin
  Mohammed Kousa
  Chaiwat Kunsata
  Fareed Al-Marzouqi
  Ravshan Irmatov

Assistant Referees

  Nathan Gibson
  Mahbubur Mahbub
  Liu Tiejun
  Yau Tak Lee
  Sankar Komaleeswaran
  Aries Soetomo
  Khalil Ibrahim Abbas
  Fathi Arabati
  Mohamed Saeed
  Ali Ahmed Al Qasimi
  Fayez Al Basha
  Ali Al Khalifi
  Chandrajith Marasinghe
  Bengech Allaberdyev
  Taoufik Adjengui
  The Toan Truong

First round 
All times are China standard time (UTC+8)

Group A

Group B

Group C

Group D

Knockout stage 
All times are China standard time (UTC+8)

Quarter-finals

Semi-finals

Third place playoff

Final

Statistics

Goalscorers

With five goals, A'ala Hubail and Ali Karimi are the top scorers in the tournament. In total, 96 goals were scored by 58 different players, with two of them credited as own goals.

5 goals

 A'ala Hubail
 Ali Karimi

4 goals
 Lee Dong-gook
3 goals

 Shao Jiayi
 Zheng Zhi
 Ali Daei
 Yuji Nakazawa
 Keiji Tamada
 Imad Al-Hosni

2 goals

 Husain Ali
 Mohamed Hubail
 Talal Yousef
 Hao Haidong
 Li Ming
 Javad Nekounam
 Takashi Fukunishi
 Shunsuke Nakamura
 Koji Nakata
 Ahn Jung-hwan
 Yasser Al-Qahtani
 Begench Kuliyev
 Alexander Geynrikh
 Mirjalol Qosimov

1 goal

 Saleh Farhan
 Duaij Naser
 Li Jinyu
 Li Yi
 Xu Yunlong
 Elie Aiboy
 Ponaryo Astaman
 Budi Sudarsono
 Mohammad Alavi
 Reza Enayati
 Mohammad Nosrati
 Nashat Akram
 Razzaq Farhan
 Younis Mahmoud
 Hawar Mulla Mohammed
 Qusay Munir
 Takayuki Suzuki
 Anas Al-Zboun
 Khaled Saad
 Mahmoud Shelbaieh
 Cha Du-ri
 Seol Ki-hyeon
 Kim Nam-il
 Bashar Abdullah
 Bader Al-Mutawa
 Magid Mohamed
 Wesam Rizik
 Hamad Al-Montashari
 Sutee Suksomkit
 Nazar Bayramov
 Vladimir Bayramov
 Mohamed Rashid
 Vladimir Shishelov

Own goals
 Park Jin-seop (1) (for Iran)
 Rangsan Viwatchaichok (1) (for Oman)
 Basheer Saeed (1) (for Kuwait)

Note: Koji Nakata's second goal was a handball.

Awards
Most Valuable Player
 Shunsuke Nakamura

Top Scorer
 A'ala Hubail
 Ali Karimi

Fair-Play Award

Team of the Tournament

Final standings

Marketing

Official match ball 
Official match ball was Adidas Roteiro

Official mascot 
Official mascot was Bei Bei

Official song 
The AFC selected "宣言 (Declaration)", "Take Me To The Sky" (Englilsh Version Title) by Chinese singer Tiger Hu as the tournament's official song.

Controversies
Like other sports events, the Asian Cup 2004 was publicised as evidence of China's economic and athletic progress, being referred to by some as a prelude to the 2008 Summer Olympics. Many Chinese see the tournament as a success and take great pride in having showcased such an important sporting event in advance of the Olympic Games. However, the Japanese media and many other international observers have pointed out bad manners on the part of Chinese fans, and sparse attendance at the tournament, raising questions on China's ability to hold such sporting events. 

Throughout the tournament, most Chinese fans in the stadia expressed anti-Japanese sentiments by drowning out the Japanese national anthem, displaying political banners and booing whenever Japan got the ball, regardless of the score or opponent. This was reported by the international media, and was aggravated when Koji Nakata apparently knocked in the ball with his right hand in the final. The PRC government responded by calling for restraint and increasing police numbers to maintain order. The Japanese government also called on the PRC to ensure the safety of Japanese fans, while specifically asking Japanese nationals or people of Japanese origin to not display any form of excessive pride. Despite the Chinese government's campaign, a riot started by Chinese fans broke out near the north gate of the Workers' Stadium, though reports differ as to the extent of the riot. As a result, some media groups have said that displays of "excessive Chinese nationalism during the Beijing 2008 Summer Olympics have become a cause for concern for Chinese officials".

References

External links
RSSSF Details
Official website (Archived)

 
AFC Asian Cup tournaments
International association football competitions hosted by China
Asia
2004 in Chinese football
July 2004 sports events in Asia
August 2004 sports events in Asia